Figma is a collaborative web application for interface design, with additional offline features enabled by desktop applications for macOS and Windows. The feature set of Figma focuses on user interface and user experience design, with an emphasis on real-time collaboration, utilising a variety of vector graphics editor and prototyping tools. The Figma mobile app for Android and iOS allows viewing and interacting with Figma prototypes in real-time on mobile and tablet devices.

History 
Dylan Field and Evan Wallace began working on Figma in 2012 while studying computer science at Brown University. Wallace studied graphics and was a Teacher Assistant for the Computer Science Department, while Field chaired the CS Departmental Undergraduate Group.

The original objective behind Figma was to enable "anyone [to] be creative by creating free, simple, creative tools in a browser." Field and Wallace experimented with different ideas, including software for drones and a meme generator, before settling on web-based graphics editor software. The company's early scope was described in a 2012 article by The Brown Daily Herald vaguely as "a technology startup that will allow users to creatively express themselves online." That article reported that the company's first ideas revolved around 3D content generation, and subsequent ideas focused on photo editing and object segmentation.

Field was named a Thiel Fellow in 2012, earning him $100,000 in exchange for taking a leave of absence from college. Wallace joined Field in California after completing his degree in computer science, and the two began working on the company full time.

Figma started offering a free invite-only preview program on December 3, 2015. It saw its first public release on September 27, 2016.

On October 22, 2019, Figma launched Figma Community, allowing designers to publish their work for others to view and adapt.

On April 21, 2021, Figma launched a digital whiteboarding capability called FigJam, allowing users to collaborate with sticky notes, emojis and drawing tools.

In June 2022, Google for Education announced that it would be partnering with Figma to bring its design and prototyping platform, as well as FigJam, to education Chromebooks.

Proposed acquisition by Adobe 
On September 15, 2022, Adobe announced it had entered into an agreement to acquire Figma for about $20 billion in cash and stock, the company's largest acquisition to-date, with Field remaining as CEO. Members of the design community showed concerns for the future of the product—including potential or mandatory integration with Adobe Creative Cloud, or being forced to adopt business models otherwise unfavorable in comparison to those presently used by Figma. Adobe shares fell by 17% following the announcement. 

The proposed purchase has been criticized on antitrust grounds, and as being an overvaluation; the application competes with Adobe XD, which had begun to lose market share to Figma by 2021. John Naughton went as far as comparing the purchase to Facebook's acquisition of WhatsApp, a move that was intended to prevent it from growing into a competitor to Facebook's core businesses.  On November 2, 2022, it was reported that the Federal Trade Commission (FTC) had begun an investigation. In February 2023, it was announced the European Commission would review the acquisition under the European Union merger laws.

Funding 
In June 2013, Figma raised $3.8 million in seed funding. In December 2015, the company raised $14 million in Series A funding. In February 2018, Figma raised $25 million in a Series B round. In February 2019, Figma raised $40 million in Series C funding. In April 2020, Figma raised $50 million in a Series D funding round. In June 2021, Figma raised $200 million in a Series E funding round.

Figma was valued at more than $2 billion by April 2020 and $10 billion by the end of May 2021.

See also 
 Comparison of vector graphics editors

References

External links 
 
 Evan Wallace's Personal Website

Announced information technology acquisitions
Cloud applications
Collaborative software
Vector graphics editors